Margaret Helen Dence  (born 1 February 1942) is an Australian actress of stage and screen, with a career spanning some seven decades. She is equally at home in both comedy and drama roles.

Dence is best known to early audiences for her roles in the satirical TV comedy The Mavis Bramston Show, and also serving as that series' mascot (originally portrayed by Noeline Brown).

Dence featured in comedy Kingswood Country with stars Ross Higgins and Judi Farr as snobbish Merle Bullpit.

Her dramatic roles she is known for in TV series The Sullivans as Rose Sullivan Prisoner as Bev Baker and Neighbours as school headmistress Dorothy Burke.

Professional career

Stage TV and Film
Dence is well known to Sydney theatre audiences for the very large number of roles she has played, in particular with the Nimrod Theatre Company. She has also appeared in panto in the United Kingdom.

From 1966 to 1968 she had played various characters in the influential Australian satirical sketch comedy program The Mavis Bramston Show. One of her characters was the title character Mavis Bramston – the joke being that Mavis appeared in only the opening segment of each episode and was not seen again thereafter. She was also a recurring guest in the popular 1980s sitcom Kingswood Country, playing the snobbish Merle Bulpitt.

Her best-known soap opera roles are The Sullivans as the sweet-natured Rose Sullivan between 1976 and 1978, Prisoner Cell Block H in a darker role in 1984 as an evil psychopath and serial killer called Bev "The Beast" Baker, and Neighbours as stern school headmistress Dorothy Burke in the early 1990s.

Dence also had smaller cameo roles in TV serials A Country Practice, The Flying Doctors, All Saints and Heartbreak High.

In 2005 she appeared in the award-winning Australian film Look Both Ways.

Filmography

Film

Television

Awards and recognition
Dence was named (on 29 September) the 2011 recipient of the Equity Awards Lifetime Achievement Award for her outstanding services to the performing arts – both stage and screen – and her longstanding involvement with the NSW Actors' Benevolent Fund. The award, presented by Foxtel, is from Maggie's peers and members of her union, the Media, Entertainment & Arts Alliance Equity (Performers) Section, which she joined in 1962.

Dence was appointed a Member of the Order of Australia (AM) in the 2022 Queen's Birthday Honours "for service to the performing arts".

References

External links

Maggie Dence as Dorothy Burke

Living people
People from Victoria (Australia)
1942 births
Australian soap opera actresses
Members of the Order of Australia